Justin McCarthy (22 September 1894 – 26 February 1981) was an Australian rules footballer who played for Carlton and Essendon in the VFL before and after the First World War.

McCarthy played with Essendon during their 'Mosquito Fleet' era and was one of their taller players at 182 cm. He was used as a centre half forward, having his best season in 1923 when he kicked 23 goals including two in Essendon's grand final win over Fitzroy.

References

Holmesby, Russell and Main, Jim (2007). The Encyclopedia of AFL Footballers. 7th ed. Melbourne: Bas Publishing.

External links

Justin McCarthy's playing statistics from The VFA Project

Australian rules footballers from Victoria (Australia)
Carlton Football Club players
Essendon Football Club players
Essendon Football Club Premiership players
Footscray Football Club (VFA) players
1894 births
1981 deaths
Two-time VFL/AFL Premiership players